The Business School (TBS) is a career-oriented for-profit university and high school located in Georgetown, Guyana. The Business School – High School was established in September 1997. There is also a branch in Berbice.

Programs
Academic programs include Business, Accounting, Science, Project Management, Marketing, Information Technology and Specialized Training.

The college is accredited by a number of educational bodies including the Chartered Institute of Marketing (CIM), Association of Chartered Certified Accountants (ACCA), Association of Business Executives (ABE), and Caribbean Examinations Council (CXC). TBS is a participating college under the American Management Association (AMA) Self Study University Certificate Program.

References

External links
Official website

High schools and secondary schools in Guyana
Universities and colleges in Guyana
Educational institutions established in 1975
1975 establishments in Guyana
Buildings and structures in Georgetown, Guyana